Ara Ball is a Canadian film director and screenwriter from Quebec. He is most noted as a two-time Prix Jutra/Prix Iris nominee for Best Live Action Short Film, receiving nominations at the 16th Jutra Awards in 2014 for Hurricane Boy Fuck You Tabarnak! (L'Ouragan Fuck You Tabarnak!) and at the 18th Quebec Cinema Awards in 2016 for The Pedophile (Le Pédophile).

His debut feature film, When Love Digs a Hole (Quand l'amour se creuse un trou), was released in 2018.

References

External links

21st-century Canadian screenwriters
Canadian screenwriters in French
Film directors from Quebec
Writers from Quebec
Living people
Canadian male screenwriters
Year of birth missing (living people)